Domenico Carafa della Spina di Traetto (12 July 1805 – 17 June 1879) was a Catholic Cardinal, Archbishop of Benevento and Camerlengo of the Sacred College of Cardinals.

Personal life
Carafa was born in Naples, Italy on 12 July 1805. He was the son of Palatine Prince and Count Francesco Carafa della Spina, 3rd duke of Traetto, and Paola Orsini, of the princes of Solofra and the dukes of Gravina.

He was educated at the Collegio Nazareno in Rome (1817 to 1823) and at the Pontifical Academy of Ecclesiastical Nobles in Rome (1823). He also received a doctorate in utroque iuris, both civil and canon law on 22 July 1826.

Church service
Carafa was ordained as a priest at age 35 on 30 May 1841.

Only three years later on 22 July 1844, Carafa was elevated to Cardinal and appointed Archbishop of Benevento and Cardinal-Priest of S. Maria degli Angeli

Carafa was expelled from Benevento in 1860 after its annexation to the Italian kingdom.

Vatican service

Carafa was appointed Camerlengo of the Sacred College of Cardinals between 1864 and 1865.

He was also appointed Secretary of Apostolic Briefs on 30 January 1879 and Grand Chancellor of the Pontifical Military Orders.

Council and conclaves

Carafa attended the First Vatican Council in 1869 and the Papal Conclaves of 1846 (which elected Pope Pius IX) and 1878 (which elected Pope Leo XIII).

Final appointment and death

On 12 May 1879, Carafa received his final assignment; appointment as Cardinal-Priest of S. Lorenzo in Lucina. He died the following month on 17 June 1879, though some biographies suggest he died the previous day on 16 June 1879.

He lay in state in the metropolitan cathedral of Naples and was buried, temporarily, in the chapel of the archconfraternity of the Bianchi dello Spirito Santo, in the new cemetery of that city.

On his death he was the last surviving cardinal elevated by Pope Gregory XVI.

References

1805 births
1879 deaths
Archbishops of Benevento
19th-century Italian Roman Catholic archbishops
Cardinals created by Pope Gregory XVI
Domenico
Pontifical Ecclesiastical Academy alumni
19th-century Italian cardinals